The Suzuki DR350 is a 350cc single cylinder, dual-sport motorcycle introduced in 1990 and produced until 2001.
The DR350S and DR350 were kick start motorcycles until 1994 when the DR350SE was introduced adding an electric start. The engine is an air-cooled  single cylinder overhead cam (OHC) 4V (four valves per cylinder), with the Suzuki Advanced Cooling System (SACS), dry sump lubrication, 6-speed manual transmission, 21-inch front wheel and 18-inch rear wheel. The brake disc at the front wheel is a single 220mm disc and at the rear wheel is a 200mm brake disc.

The motorcycle has an acceleration speed of 1/4 mile (40.23 km) in 15.1 seconds and a top speed of 87 mph(140 kmh.)  
 

DR350
Dual-sport motorcycles
Motorcycles introduced in 1990
Single-cylinder_motorcycles